The 2008–09 Lega Pro Seconda Divisione season was the thirty-first football (soccer) league season of Italian Lega Pro Seconda Divisione since its establishment in 1978, and the first since the renaming from Serie C2 to Lega Pro.

It was divided into two phases: the regular season, played from September 2008 to May 2009, and the playoff phase from May to June 2009.

It was composed of 54 teams divided into three divisions of 18 teams each, whose teams were divided geographically.  Teams only played other teams in their own division, once at home and once away for a total of 34 matches each.

Teams finishing first in the regular season, plus one team winning the playoff round from each division were promoted to Lega Pro Prima Divisione; teams finishing last in the regular season, plus two relegation playoff losers from each division were relegated to Serie D.  In all, six teams were promoted to Lega Pro Prima Divisione, and nine teams were relegated to Serie D.

Events

Start of season
The league was to feature six teams relegated from Serie C1 in 2007–08; Lecco, Manfredonia, Pro Patria, Lanciano, Martina, and Sangiovannese.  Four vacancies were created with the re-admission of Pro Patria, Lanciano, and Lecco to Lega Pro Prima Divisione in 2008-09, and the non-admission of Martina.

It featured nine teams promoted from 2007–08 Serie D; Alessandria, Aversa Normanna, Como, Figline, Fortitudo Cosenza, Giacomense, Isola Liri, Itala San Marco, and Sangiustese.

The remaining 39 teams were to come from the group of teams that played in 2007–08 Serie C2 that were neither relegated nor promoted. Of those, Nuorese (9th in Girone A), Sassari Torres (13th in Girone A), Teramo (8th in Girone B), and Castelnuovo (15th in Girone B) were banned or failed to register, creating four more vacancies.  A fifth vacancy from this group was created when SPAL, which lost in last year's promotional play-offs, was admitted to Lega Pro Prima Divisione anyway to fill a vacancy.

In all, nine vacancies were created.  They were filled as follows:

Sambonifacese - Serie D Playoff winner (Serie D/C 3rd)
Colligiana - Serie D Playoff runner-up (Serie D/E 2nd)
Montichiari - Serie D Playoff semi-finalist (Serie D/D - 2nd)
Alghero - Serie D Playoff semi-finalist (Serie D/G - 4th)
Barletta - Serie D best second-placed team in group phase of playoffs (Serie D/H - 2nd)
Rovigo - a loser in Serie C2/B play-outs and originally destined to play in Serie D
Andria - a loser in Serie C2/C play-outs and originally destined to play in Serie D
Val di Sangro - a loser in Serie C2/C play-outs and originally destined to play in Serie D
Pizzighettone - which finished last in Serie C2/A and originally destined to play in Serie D

Considering all changes, the final team list includes only 2 teams that played in Serie C1 last year, 38 teams that played in Serie C2, and 14 teams that played in Serie D.

Promotions
Two of the three division champions were playing in Serie D in 2007–08. Figline and Cosenza won direct promotion to Lega Pro Prima Divisione for the 2009–10 season by winning Girone B and Girone C respectively.  The year before they had been division champions in their respective Serie D divisions, and have thus both been promoted twice in consecutive years.    Varese won direct promotion by winning Girone A.  Varese played in Lega Pro Seconda Divisione/C2 for three years after winning promotion from Serie D in the 2005–06 season.

Relegations

Teams
On August 14, 2008 the following clubs were confirmed to be competing in the division:

Girone A

Girone B

Girone C

League tables

Girone A

Girone B

Girone C

Promotion and relegation playoffs

Girone A

Promotion
Promotion playoff semifinals
First legs played May 31, 2009; return legs played June 7, 2009

Promotion playoff finals
First leg played June 14, 2009; return leg played June 21, 2009

Como promoted to Lega Pro Prima Divisione

Relegation
Relegation playoffs
First legs played May 31, 2009; return legs played June 7, 2009

Montichiari and Valenzana relegated to Serie D

Girone B

Promotion
Promotion playoff semifinals
First legs played May 31, 2009; return legs played June 7, 2009

Promotion playoff finals
First leg played June 14, 2009; return leg played June 21, 2009

Giulianova promoted to Lega Pro Prima Divisione

Relegation
Relegation playoffs
First legs played May 31, 2009; return legs played June 7, 2009

Cuoiocappiano and Poggibonsi relegated to Serie D

Girone C

Promotion
Promotion playoff semifinals
First legs played May 31, 2009; return legs played June 7, 2009

Promotion playoff finals
First leg played June 14, 2009; return leg played June 21, 2009

Pescina V.d.G. promoted to Lega Pro Prima Divisione

Relegation
Relegation playoffs
First legs played May 31, 2009; return legs played June 7, 2009

Isola Liri and Val di Sangro relegated to Serie D

References

External links
Lega Pro Official Website

Lega Pro Seconda Divisione seasons
Italy
4